Carlos Rafael Rivera (born 18 August, 1970) is an American composer based out of Guatemala. In 2014, his music score for the movie A Walk Among the Tombstones advanced for Oscar in the Best Original Score category. He has won an Emmy Award (for Outstanding Music Composition for a Limited or Anthology Series, Movie or Special), a Grammy Award (for Best Score Soundtrack for Visual Media), and a Hollywood Music in Media Award (for Best Original Score in a TV Show/Limited Series) for his work in Netflix miniseries The Queen's Gambit (2020) and received two additional Emmy nominations (for Outstanding Music Composition for a Limited Series, Movie, or Special and Outstanding Original Main Title Theme Music) for his work in another Netflix miniseries Godless (2017).

Education
He attended Belen Jesuit Preparatory School for high school. He studied guitar and received a Bachelors of Music in Composition at Florida International University School of Music in Miami in 1996. 
He has a Doctor of Musical Arts degree from the University of Southern California.

Discography

Film soundtracks

References

External links
 

21st-century American composers
1970 births
Living people
USC Thornton School of Music alumni
Place of birth missing (living people)
Grammy Award winners

Primetime Emmy Award winners